Lahiguera is a city located in the province of Jaén, Spain. According to the 2005 census (INE), the city has a population of 1890 inhabitants.

References 

Municipalities in the Province of Jaén (Spain)